Krypton is an unincorporated community within Perry County, Kentucky, United States. Their Post Office is still active .

References

Unincorporated communities in Perry County, Kentucky
Unincorporated communities in Kentucky
Coal towns in Kentucky